Qaleh-ye Aslanian (also Romanized as Qal‘eh-ye Aşlānīān; also known as Gala, Kalāt, and Qal‘eh) is a village in Kaghazkonan-e Shomali Rural District, Kaghazkonan District, Meyaneh County, East Azerbaijan Province, Iran. As of the 2006 census, its population was 32, with 11 families.

References 

Populated places in Meyaneh County